Ayyanakere is a lake near Sakharayapatna village of Karnataka, India and it is located at a distance of  from Chickmagalur. The lake has 10 canals to distribute water.

The lake
It is believed that the lake was constructed originally by Rukmangada Raya, the ruler of Sakharayapatna village and later renovated during 1156 A.D. by Hoysala Kings. It feeds 1560 hectares of agricultural lands. The lake is known for its beautiful landscape with Shakunagiri hill in the background, but lack of facilities discourage tourists to visit this lake.

References

Lakes of Karnataka
Geography of Chikkamagaluru district
Tourist attractions in Chikkamagaluru district